Brook Toland is an American actress best known for her role on ABC Family's Becoming Us television show, which was produced by Ryan Seacrest. Prior to this, Toland co-starred in an independent film called Innocent in 2009 with Alexa Vega.

Filmography

Film & Television

References

1992 births
20th-century American actresses
21st-century American actresses
Actresses from Evanston, Illinois
American child actresses
Secular humanists
American film actresses
DePaul University alumni
American television actresses
Living people